Antonio Corrionero de Babilafuente (died 13 May 1570) was a Roman Catholic prelate who served as the fifth Bishop of Almería (1557–1570).

Biography
On 10 Dec 1557, he was selected by the King of Spain and confirmed by Pope Paul IV as Bishop of Almería and consecrated bishop in 1558. He served as Bishop of Almería until his death on 13 May 1570.

References 

1570 deaths
16th-century Roman Catholic bishops in Spain
Bishops appointed by Pope Paul IV